Greenpeace Nordic is a regional branch of the non-governmental international environmental organization Greenpeace. Greenpeace Nordic is registered in Stockholm with offices also in Helsinki, Copenhagen and Oslo.

Climate change reports 
The main worldwide Greenpeace energy revolution demands are:
 Phase out all subsidies for fossil fuels and nuclear energy.
 Internalise external (social and environmental) costs through ‘cap and trade’ emissions trading.
 Mandate strict efficiency standards for all energy consuming appliances, buildings and vehicles.
 Establish legally binding targets for renewable energy and combined heat and power generation.
 Reform the electricity markets by guaranteeing priority access to the grid for renewable power generators.
 Provide defined and stable returns for investors, for example through feed-in tariff payments.
 Implement better labelling and disclosure mechanisms to provide more environmental product information.
 Increase research and development budgets for renewable energy and energy efficiency.

Finland 
According to the Greenpeace Energy [R]evolution scenario for Finland in 2012, the final energy demand will decreases by 35% compared to current consumption by 2050. By 2050, 94% of the electricity produced in Finland will come from renewable energy sources. 'New' renewables – mainly wind and PV – will contribute 48% of electricity generation. Already by 2020, the share of renewable electricity production will be 52% and 74% by 2030. The installed capacity of renewables will reach 21 GW in 2030 and 45 GW by 2050. Greenpeace is campaigning against E.ON nuclear project in northern Finland. Greenpeace Nordic activists intercepted a Shell-contracted icebreaker, the Nordica, in May 2012.

Sweden 
According to Greenpeace Sweden, the nuclear accident at Japan's Fukushima Daiichi Nuclear Power Plant will also be seen as a turning point in world energy policy. Germany, Switzerland, and Italy decided to phase out existing reactors and Sweden started discussions about the future of nuclear. Environment minister Andreas Carlgren told in summer 2011: "We want Sweden to be the first country in the world to have an energy system based wholly on renewable energy." By Greenpeace the reduction of our greenhouse gas emissions significantly makes both environmental and economic sense. By 2050, Sweden's entire electricity demand will be produced from renewable sources. A capacity of 56,800 MW will produce 169 TWh/a renewable electricity in 2050.

References

External links 

 Greenpeace Nordic intercepts Shell ship (again)
 Greenpeace starts campaigning against E.ON nuclear project in Northern Finland 5 October 2011
 Annual report 2011 

Environmental organisations based in Finland
Environmental organizations based in Denmark
Environmental organisations based in Norway
Environmental organizations based in Sweden
Greenpeace